Charbaniari Union is an Union parishad of Chitalmari Upazila, Bagerhat District in Khulna Division of Bangladesh. It has an area of 63.66 km2 (24.58 sq mi) and a population of 19,167.

References

Unions of Chitalmari Upazila
Unions of Bagerhat District
Unions of Khulna Division